Méru (Latin: Matrius, Meruacum) is a commune in the Oise department in northern France. Méru station has rail connections to Beauvais and Paris.

Population

See also
 Communes of the Oise department

References

External links

 City council website 

Communes of Oise